Julius Diez (18 September 1870, Nuremberg – 15 May 1957, Munich) was a German artist, active in etching, drawing, painting and graphic design.

1870 births
1957 deaths
German graphic designers
German etchers
Commanders Crosses of the Order of Merit of the Federal Republic of Germany
20th-century German painters
20th-century German male artists
German male painters
20th-century German printmakers